Dott Ice Rise is a peninsula-like feature that is ice-drowned except for the Barrett Nunataks, about 20 nautical miles (40 km) long, extending eastward from the Heritage Range of the Ellsworth Mountains and terminating at Constellation Inlet at the southwest edge of Ronne Ice Shelf. It was mapped by the United States Geological Survey from surveys and U.S. Navy air photos, 1961–66, and was named by the Advisory Committee on Antarctic Names for Robert H. Dott, a United States Antarctic Research Program geologist and senior U.S. representative at Bernardo O'Higgins Base, summer 1961–62.

References 

Ice rises of Antarctica
Bodies of ice of Ellsworth Land
Filchner-Ronne Ice Shelf
Ice rises of Queen Elizabeth Land